Anne Pierre de Kat (1 May 1881 – 25 July 1968) was a Belgian painter. His work was part of the painting event in the art competition at the 1936 Summer Olympics.

References

1881 births
1968 deaths
20th-century Belgian painters
Belgian painters
Olympic competitors in art competitions
People from Delft